Robert James Tuck (November 23, 1863 – October 2, 1930) was an American Democratic politician who served as a member of the Virginia House of Delegates, representing Halifax County for one term, from 1899 to 1901. He was the father of William Munford Tuck, who served as Governor of Virginia from 1946 to 1950.

References

External links

1863 births
1930 deaths
Democratic Party members of the Virginia House of Delegates
People from Halifax County, Virginia
19th-century American politicians
20th-century American politicians